Larkspur Landing, also known as Larkspur Ferry Terminal, is the main Golden Gate Ferry terminal in Larkspur, California, in Marin County, north of San Francisco. The terminal is a regional hub receiving heavy service from throughout the North Bay for commuter ferries south to downtown San Francisco.

History

Among various San Francisco Bay Area properties owned by San Francisco-born civil engineer Alfred Finnila in the 1970s was the area known as Larkspur Landing in Marin County. In the mid-1970s, Finnila sold, leased and rented parts of Larkspur Landing to the City of Larkspur and to various businesses, including the restaurant chain of Victoria Station.

The part of the area sold to the City of Larkspur by Alfred Finnila, to be used as a major Marin County ferry terminal, is today known both as Larkspur Landing and as Larkspur Ferry Terminal. It is the main Golden Gate Ferry terminal in Larkspur, Marin County. The ferry service operates daily with a Marin - San Francisco schedule tailored to both commuters and visitors.

Constructed in the mid-1970s, Larkspur Ferry Terminal rose from the ashes of the long demolished Hutchinson's Rock Quarry. The Ferry Terminal was built with an  open air space frame, or tetrahedral-octahedral tesselation, a canopy designed by architect  The Ferry Terminal opened on December 11, 1976, and regular commute service started two days later. The ex-quarry-property also spawned the Larkspur Landing Shopping Center (now Marin Country Mart), with adjacent apartments and 

Sonoma–Marin Area Rail Transit terminates at Larkspur station, located near the ferry terminal. It serves as an intermodal station, where passengers can transfer to San Francisco-bound ferries after a 
 walk. The station opened for service on December 14, 2019.

In popular culture
Director Don Siegel filmed the final scenes of the 1971 movie Dirty Harry in the vicinity of Larkspur Landing and at the adjacent East Sir Francis Drake Boulevard. After hijacking a school bus, the character of "Scorpio" - played by Andy Robinson - drives into East Sir Francis Drake Boulevard at the Greenbrae interchange, before crashing into the site of the Hutchinson Company

References

External links

 Prime Rib and Boxcars: Whatever Happened to Victoria Station? History of the chain.
 Victoria Station is still working on its restructuring. March 19, 1986 - Los Angeles Times (re: Victoria Station at Larkspur Landing in California).
 FINALE – Hutchinson Co. Quarry, Larkspur Landing, CA « Dirty Harry Filming Locations.
 20sep2002 Dirty Harry - filming locations. Acme.com - access date 2012-11-15.

Ferry terminals in the San Francisco Bay Area
Larkspur, California
Public transportation in Marin County, California
Bus stations in Marin County, California
San Francisco Bay Trail
Transport infrastructure completed in 1976
1976 establishments in California
Transportation buildings and structures in Marin County, California